Love You to Death is the eighth studio album by Canadian indie pop duo Tegan and Sara, released on June 3, 2016, on Neil Young's label Vapor Records through Warner Bros. Records. Produced by Greg Kurstin, it is the follow-up to the duo's 2013 release Heartthrob, also produced in part by Kurstin. "Boyfriend" was released as the album's lead single on April 8, 2016. The same day, "U-Turn" was also released as a promotional single.

Background
It was revealed in November 2015 by Stereogum that Tegan and Sara had completed recording of the then untitled album. The band announced the name of the album on their official Facebook on March 10, 2016, with the official album art released the next day on their official Instagram account.

Recording and production
At the Beats 1 premiere interview, Sara explained the concept behind the album's lead single "Boyfriend":
As Quin explained to DJ Matt Wilkinson, the song details a love triangle she found herself in with a woman who not only hadn't dated another girl before, but was still seeing another man.
"I think that's pretty relatable. Obviously, being gay, there's sort of a bit of a gender twist in the song, and I get that that sometimes doesn't seem immediately relatable to everybody, whether they're straight or whatever. But this idea, you know, that we've all been in that situation where we really like someone and we want to make it official, and they're not ready, that's what the song is about."

Release
The album became available for pre-order on iTunes, Amazon Music, Google Play, and in retail stores and other music distribution platforms on April 8, 2016, and was released on June 3, 2016.

Singles
Since the album has become available for pre-order, one official single has been released from the album, titled "Boyfriend". The single first became available to listen to via Beats 1 on April 7, 2016, and was available to download the next day.

The twins announced via their Instagram account that "Stop Desire" would be released as the second single from the album. The track is also featured on the soundtrack and in the trailer of The Sims 4: City Living expansion pack.

Promotional singles
"U-turn" was released as a promotional single along with "Boyfriend" on April 8, 2016 for listeners who pre-ordered the album. "100x" was released as the second promotional single on May 6, 2016, and "Stop Desire" was released as the third and final promotional single on May 20, 2016.

Critical reception

Love You to Death received generally positive reviews from music critics. At Metacritic, which assigns a normalized rating out of 100 to reviews from mainstream critics, the album has an average score of 78 out of 100 based on 24 reviews, which indicates "generally favorable reviews". Tim Sendra of AllMusic writes: "This is pop music that is all heart all the time, and for that, the sisters deserve every accolade that comes their way." Spins Rachel Brodsky claims: "All over their eighth album, the Quins continue to demonstrate what makes them such fine songwriters." Jordan Bassett of NME calls it a "perfectly formed record full of buoyant pop songs." Exclaim!s Ryan McNutt gave the album a positive review, calling it "another solid soundtrack for summer romances and road-trips alike". "Every track is a three-minute formalist construct that captures a mood... every one is catchy," said Robert Christgau in his review for Vice.

Accolades

Commercial performance
Love You to Death entered the Billboard 200 at number 16. In its second week, the album fell to number 181. In the United Kingdom, Love You to Death reached number 30. In Canada, Love You to Death reached number three and spent three weeks on the chart.

Track listing
Credits adapted from the iTunes pre-order listing.

Personnel
Credits adapted from AllMusic.

Musicians
 Sara Quin – vocals
 Tegan Quin – vocals
 Greg Kurstin – keyboards (all tracks), bass (tracks 1–6, 9 and 10), drums (tracks 1–6, 8–10), guitar (tracks 1, 3, 5, 6 and 8), acoustic guitar (track 9), piano (tracks 4, 6 and 9)

Technical personnel
 Chris Allgood – mastering assistance
 Julian Burg – engineering
 Chris Galland – assistance

 Greg Kurstin – engineering, production
 Emily Lazar – mastering
 Pamela Littky – photography
 Manny Marroquin – mixing
 Alex Pasco – engineering
 Ike Schultz – assistance
 Jeff Sosnow – A&R
 E.E. Storey – art direction, design

Charts

References

Tegan and Sara albums
Sire Records albums
2016 albums
Albums produced by Greg Kurstin
Albums recorded at EastWest Studios
Vapor Records albums